Ron Lipton (born August 8, 1946) is an American boxing referee who has officiated in world title bouts in the United States, Ireland and Italy, and on HBO pay-per-view. Lipton refereed fights involving Evander Holyfield, Ray Mercer, Roy Jones Jr., Oscar De La Hoya, David Tua, Junior Jones, Chris Eubank, Donovan Ruddock, Pernell Whitaker and Roberto Durán.

Lipton was a sparring partner of 'Hurricane' Rubin Carter, Dick Tiger and many other prominent boxers during his youth. World Boxing Magazine touted Ron Lipton as one of the hardest one shot punchers to come out of the amateur ranks.

In May 2013, Lipton refereed the vacant International Women's Boxing Federation World Super Featherweight contest between Ronica Jeffrey of Brooklyn, New York and former World Boxing Council World Super Featherweight champion Olivia Gerula of Winnipeg, Manitoba, Canada. The winner, Ronica Jeffrey, emerged as the BoxRec number three ranked female featherweight in the world.

Ron Lipton trained with Cunyiso Crumalo in 1969.

He now works at Marist College in Poughkeepsie, New York

References

American boxing referees
Living people
1946 births